Düsseldorf I is an electoral constituency (German: Wahlkreis) represented in the Bundestag. It elects one member via first-past-the-post voting. Under the current constituency numbering system, it is designated as constituency 106. It is located in western North Rhine-Westphalia, comprising the northern part of the city of Düsseldorf.

Düsseldorf I was created for the inaugural 1949 federal election. Since 2009, it has been represented by Thomas Jarzombek of the Christian Democratic Union (CDU).

Geography
Düsseldorf I is located in western North Rhine-Westphalia. As of the 2021 federal election, it comprises the northern part of the independent city of Düsseldorf, specifically districts 1, 2, 4, 5, 6, and 7.

History
Düsseldorf I was created in 1949. In the 1949 election, it was North Rhine-Westphalia constituency 19 in the numbering system. From 1953 through 1961, it was number 78. From 1965 through 1998, it was number 74. From 2002 through 2009, it was number 107. Since 2013, it has been number 106.

Originally, the constituency comprised the modern districts 1, 3 (excluding Oberbilk), 4, 5 (excluding Angermund, Kalkum, and Wittlaer), and Lichtenbroich and Unterrath from 6. From 1965 through 1976, it comprised districts 4, 5 (excluding Angermund, Kalkum, and Wittlaer), Lichtenbroich and Unterrach from 6, and Derendorf, Golzheim, and Pempelfort from 1. It acquired its current borders in the 1980 election.

Members
The constituency has been held by the Christian Democratic Union (CDU) during all but two Bundestag terms since 1949. It was first represented by Robert Lehr of the CDU from 1949 to 1953. He was succeeded by Josef Gockeln from 1953 to 1961, followed by Gottfried Arnold until 1983. Wolfgang Schulhoff then served as representative until 1998, when Michael Müller of the Social Democratic Party (SPD) was elected. He was re-elected in 2002, but Hildegard Müller regained the constituency for the CDU in 2005. Fellow CDU member Thomas Jarzombek was elected in 2009, and re-elected in 2013, 2017, and 2021.

Election results

2021 election

2017 election

2013 election

2009 election

References

Federal electoral districts in North Rhine-Westphalia
Düsseldorf
Constituencies established in 1949
1949 establishments in West Germany